The Treaty of Paris, also known as Treaty of Meaux, was signed on 12 April 1229 between Raymond VII of Toulouse and Louis IX of France in Meaux near Paris. Louis was still a minor, and it was his mother Blanche of Castile, as regent, who was instrumental in forging the treaty. The agreement officially ended the Albigensian Crusade, and according to the terms of the treaty, Raymond's daughter Joan was to be married to Louis' brother Alphonse. Moreover, Raymond ceded the eastern provinces of his lands to Louis and the Marquisat de Provence to the Catholic church. The treaty also gave the Inquisition absolute power regarding searching for, and seizing of, heretics.

Raymond ceded more than half his land to the French crown and retained the remainder only during his life, and it would then be inherited by his son-in-law Alphonse, Louis's brother or, if Alphonse had no heir, which occurred, by the French crown. Raymond regained his feudal rights but had to swear allegiance to Louis IX. Fortifications, such as those of Toulouse, were dismantled. The Cathars were left without political and military protection, as Raymond and his subordinates, now vassals of the French crown, were ordered to hunt them down.

See also
List of treaties

References

Sources

1229 in Europe
1220s in France
Paris
Paris (1229)
Catharism
13th-century military history of France